The Volodymyr Velykyi class or Project 58250 is a planned class of frigates (previously envisioned as multipurpose corvettes) ordered by the Ukrainian Navy.

Background and development
Before starting this project in 2002 the State Research and Design Shipbuilding Center has developed a multi-purpose corvette "Hajduk-21" for Leninska Kuznia as replacement and continuation of the Soviet s (small anti-submarine vessels), but the Ministry of Defense declined the project. It was decided to double the displacement and make a ship be compatible with the NATO ships. On the initiative of the minister of defense Anatoliy Hrytsenko, on 9 August 2005 the Cabinet of Ukraine issued an order on development of the new ship. For development of the new ship there were allotted some ₴805 million.

The new ship was projected to be a little bigger than a corvette, but smaller than a frigate. The new project was developed in 2008 by State Research and Design Shipbuilding Center. From the beginning of program there was discussion of about 10 such ships. It was planned to start the construction at the Black Sea Shipyard that belongs to Smart Holding Group with a Russian capital (Smart Holding belongs to Vadym Novynskyi). During the Soviet times, at the shipyard were built aircraft carriers. Placing the construction of the project at the shipyard had speculated from a get go on the risk of breaking the deadlines (which soon has been realized).

Construction

Construction started as planned in 2011 with planned launching in 2012. The project suffered many delays and was stopped in 2014 due to Russian military intervention.

At the end of 2017 work it was announced about resuming of construction with adoption of new version of shipbuilding program which plans to commission first ship in 2022, second in 2024, third in 2026, fourth in 2028. In spring of 2018, however, the commander of Ukrainian Navy said that there is no funding to continue construction of the ship.

There also were talks to transfer the construction to other shipyards among which were mentioned Mykolayiv Shipyard (formerly the Shipyard of 61 Communards) and Kuznya na Rybalskomu (former Leninska Kuznya). Those were originally reviewed as possible candidates.

The first ship was named after Volodymyr the Great. In 2021, the Ukrainian Ministry of Defence announced it would be completed as a frigate.

Due to the refusal of selling of anti-ship missiles from European Union, there is a program of developing the own anti-ship missile that called Neptune (first tests in 2016) and anti-air missiles that called Dnipro (first tests in 2016).

Ships

See also 
 
 List of active Ukrainian Navy ships

References

External links 
 
 
 
 
 
 Ukrainian Defense Review #1 [January-March 2013]
 [R&D] Project 58250 Volodymyr Velyky-Class Corvette

Frigates of the Ukrainian Navy
Corvettes of the Ukrainian Navy
Frigate classes
Corvette classes
Proposed ships